FC London is a Canadian semi-professional soccer club based in London, Ontario. The club was founded in 2008 and plays in the League1 Ontario men's and women's divisions. The team plays home games at the Portuguese Club of London and the Hellenic Community Centre.

The team was founded in 2008 as Forest City London Soccer Club, and were a member of the Premier Development League from 2009 to 2015; they won the 2012 PDL title, their first championship during this time. They re-branded to FC London following their move to League1 Ontario in 2016, being officially named Football Club London.

In 2017, the club partnered with Toronto FC. FC London's youth teams were renamed London TFC, while the senior team retained the name FC London, but changed its colours to red to match those of Toronto FC.

History

Founded in 2008, Forest City London joined the Premier Development League in 2009. In their first season, they had to split home matches between four stadiums. and played their first ever game on May 29, 2009, against Cleveland Internationals. London won the game 2–1, with the first goal in franchise history being scored by Kevin Zimmermann.

London's debut season was a generally positive one; they remained unbeaten over the course of their first ten games, winning seven games. London's first loss was a 3–1 drop to the Indiana Invaders at the beginning of July, and it initiated a complete reversal of fortune for the team. They did not win another game all season and dropped down the divisional standings. The team finished third in the Great Lakes Division, seven points behind divisional champions Kalamazoo, and faced off against Chicago Fire Premier in the first round of the playoffs. London  lost their playoff match 1–0 to the Illinoisans on a goal by Andre Akpan. Kevin Zimmermann and Alan McGreal were London's top scorers in their debut season, with nine and seven goals respectively, while Anthony Di Biase contributed four assists.

They won the 2012 PDL Championship defeating Carolina Dynamo in the finals. The won their first Great Lakes division title the following season.

The club moved to League1 Ontario in 2016, adding teams in both the male and female divisions. The club went under new ownership and were renamed Football Club London following the move to L1O.

The women's team won the league title in the 2016 and 2017 seasons by winning the league division, while also winning the League Cup in 2017. They won the league division again in 2018, but fell in the semi-finals in the new playoff format. In 2019, they finished third in the regular season, but won the league championship, defeating Oakville Blue Devils in the playoff final.

The men's team won the Western Conference in their debut season in L1O in 2016, but fell to Vaughan Azzurri in the championship final. In 2018, they finished as regular season champions, but ultimately fell in the playoffs. During the 2019 season, they defeated Alliance United in the two legged playoff semi-finals by a 15–0 aggregate score, after victories of 5–0 and 10–0 across the two legs, respectively, before ultimately falling to Master's FA in the championship final.

In the latter part of 2017, the club became a partner of Major League Soccer club Toronto FC, with the club being renamed London TFC, although the senior side retained the name FC London, under which it still competes in L1O. As part of the rebrand, FC London changed their club colours and logo to red to match those of Toronto FC. In 2022, the club changed ownership from Ian Campbell to a group led by Dave DeBenedictis, the director of the London TFC Academy.

Former players
The following players have either moved on to the professional ranks after their time with FC London, or played professionally before joining the club.

Seasons

Men

Women

Honours

Premier Development League 

 National Champions: 2012
 Central Conference Champions: 2012
Great Lakes Division Champions: 2013

League1 Ontario 

 Western Conference Champions: 2016
 Regular Season Champions: 2018

Head coaches

 Martin Painter (2009–2016)
 Mario Despotović (2016–2017)
 Dom Kosic (2017-2018)
 Mike Marcoccia (2018–2021)
 Ruben Quintão (2022)
 Yiannis Tsalatsidis (2023-present)

Stadium history

 TD Waterhouse Stadium; London, Ontario (2009–2010)
 London Portuguese Club Field; London, Ontario two games (2009–2010)
 London Marconi Soccer Club Field; London, Ontario four games (2009–2011)
 German Canadian Club of London Field; London, Ontario (2009–2021)
 London Portuguese Club Field; London, Ontario (2022–present)

Average attendance
Attendance
 2009: 1632
 2010: 1246
 2011: 841
 2012: 507
 2013: 1146
 2014: 777
 2015: 944
 2019: 250

References

External links
 
Official PDL site

Soccer clubs in Ontario
League1 Ontario teams
Sports teams in London, Ontario
Association football clubs established in 2008
2008 establishments in Ontario
Toronto FC